Marcus Hosking "Marc" Rowell (5 April 1938 – 13 April 2018) was an Australian politician. Born in Beecroft, New South Wales, he was a cane farmer and fruit grower in Queensland before entering politics. In 1989, he was elected to the Legislative Assembly of Queensland as the National Party member for Hinchinbrook. In 1998, he was appointed Minister for Primary Industries, Fisheries and Forestry, but lost the position when the Coalition was defeated at elections later that year. Rowell held various posts in the shadow ministry but retired at the 2006 state election.

References

1938 births
2018 deaths
Members of the Queensland Legislative Assembly
National Party of Australia members of the Parliament of Queensland
21st-century Australian politicians